Reshmi kabab is a famous  non-vegetarian chicken kebab commonly eaten  in India and Pakistan.

It certainly has a lot of Mughal influence which can be seen in the process of cooking that uses a lot of cream and cashew nut. Made with boneless chicken, it is cooked by marinating chunks of meat in curd, cream, cashew nut paste, spices and then grilled in tandoor. It has a crusty upper layer and a soft inside.

Etymology 
The Pakistani word 'Reshmi' means 'silk', known for the kabab smooth texture. It's nickname: 'Reshmi Malai Kabab' has an extra word added: Malai, which means creamy in English. The word 'Malai' has its dominance on another dishes, Malai Kofta, which is a North-Indian Dish.

Served with 
Chutneys, an Indian variant of sauces, accompanied by Reshmi (Malai) kabab are:
Mint Chutney (Green Chutney)
It is also served with salads of grated carrots, cucumber and onions, as used popularly.

Taste 
The use of curd, cream, cashew nuts and spices as marinade gives its unique taste. In fact, the words 'Reshmi' and 'Malai' is used to indicate the use of curd and cream. The marination of this kabab is so juicy and tender that really turns into a mouth melting kabab dish. The timespan in which it is cooked is considered as a crucial concept which determines its taste.

See also 
List of kebabs

Further reading 
https://www.crazymasalafood.com/top-20-delicious-and-irresistible-north-indian-food/
https://www.indiatimes.com/news/india/the-1000-year-history-of-the-kebab-on-your-plate-251253.html
https://foodiesterminal.com/chicken-reshmi-kabab-recipe/
https://zaiqedar.blogspot.com/2022/12/reshmi-kabab-recipe.html

References

South Asian cuisine